Argentina women's junior national softball team is the junior national under-17 team for Argentina.  The team competed at the 1995 ISF Junior Women's World Championship in Normal, Illinois where they finished tenth.  The team competed at the 1999 ISF Junior Women's World Championship in Taipei, Taiwan where they finished fifteenth.  The team competed at the 2003 ISF Junior Women's World Championship in Nanjing, China where they finished eleventh.  The team competed at the 2007 ISF Junior Women's World Championship in Enschede, Netherlands where they finished tenth.  The team competed at the 2011 ISF Junior Women's World Championship in Cape Town, South Africa where they finished eleventh.

References

External links 
 International Softball Federation

Softball
Women's national under-18 softball teams
Softball in Argentina
Youth sport in Argentina